The Ministry of National Defense ( Wizārat al-Difāʾ al-Waṭanī) is Lebanon's service section for the Lebanese Armed Forces. The Ministry is located in Yarzeh, Baabda District, Mount Lebanon. The building which is considered the biggest Ministry building in Lebanon was designed by the French architect André Wogenscky in 1968. The ministry building also houses the Lebanese Military Museum.

Ministers
The ministers of National Defence have been:

References

External links

http://www.lebarmy.gov.lb
List of Ministers (in Arabic)

Military of Lebanon
Defence
Lebanon